This is the complete list of Pan American Games medalists in shooting from 1951 to 2019.

Men's - Individual

10 m air pistol

10 m air rifle

10 m running target

10 metre running target mixed runs

25 metre standard pistol

25 metre center fire pistol

25 metre rapid fire pistol

50 metre pistol

50 metre rifle three positions

50 metre rifle prone

50 metre high power rifle three positions

50 m running target

50 m high power rifle standing

50 m high power rifle kneeling

50 metre running target mixed runs

50 metre rifle kneeling

50 metre rifle standing

300 metre standard rifle

300 metre rifle prone

300 metre rifle three positions

Free rifle three positions

Military rifle three positions

Military rifle standing

Running deer

Skeet

Trap

Double trap

Women's - Individual

10 m air pistol

10 m air rifle

25 metre pistol

50 metre rifle prone

50 metre rifle three positions

Trap

Double trap

Skeet

Mixed pairs events

10 m air pistol

10 m air rifle

Mixed trap

Men's team

10 metre air pistol

10 metre air rifle

10 metre running target

10 metre running target mixed runs

25 metre standard pistol team

25 metre rapid fire pistol team

25 metre center fire pistol team

50 metre pistol team

50 metre rifle three positions team

50 metre high power rifle prone

50 metre high power rifle three positions team

50 metre rifle prone team

50 m Rifle Standing Teams

50 m Rifle Kneeling Teams

50 metre running target

50 metre running target mixed runs

300 metre rifle prone

300 metre rifle three positions

300 metre standard rifle

Military rifle three positions team

Military rifle standing team

Free Rifle 3 Positions Teams

Skeet team

Trap

Double trap

Running Deer team

Women's team

10 metre air pistol

10 metre air rifle

25 metre pistol

50 metre rifle prone

50 metre rifle three positions

References

Shooting